The Malheur Enterprise is a weekly newspaper in Vale, Oregon.  It was established in 1909, and since October 2015 has been published by Malheur Enterprise Pub. Co. It is issued weekly on Wednesdays. Early on, it carried the title Malheur Enterprise and Vale Plaindealer.  its circulation has been estimated at 1,207 to 1,277.

Genesis in boosterism 

The Enterprise started out as a regional booster, with financial backing from Major Leigh Hill (L. H.) French. French, who had recently been promoting mining projects in the Klondike gold rush in Alaska and was related by marriage to the Studebaker automobile family, promoted mining, and prizefights. With his backing, the paper envisioned oil wells and irrigation projects as driving a prosperous future for the region. John Rigby, who became the paper's second manager in 1912, has been credited with rallying public opinion behind the Warm Springs Irrigation District. George Huntington Currey purchased the paper in 1917, and then traded it in 1920 for the Baker City Herald. In 1922 brothers Winfield S. and Harry Brown, who had founded other eastern Oregon papers, purchased an interest in the paper. The Enterprise played a role in the election of U.S. senator Robert Stanfield. The Enterprise was sold in 1930.

A 1950 book covering the county's early days identified the Enterprise as "one of three newsy newspapers still published in Malheur county."

The Oregon Education Association commended the Enterprise in 1972 for its "over-all education coverage."

Renewed vigor in the 2010s 
By 2015, the paper was on the verge of collapse. In the estimation of renowned journalist Les Zaitz, it was "arguably the worst newspaper in Oregon...full of government press releases."

In that year, Zaitz was approaching retirement from his multi-decade position as an investigative reporter for the Oregonian, and was planning to retire with his wife, Scotta Callister, at their Grant County ranch. But upon hearing about the Enterprise's troubles, he and Callister, who was retiring as editor of the Blue Mountain Eagle, along with his brother, Lyndon Zaitz, publisher of Keizertimes, formed the Malheur Enterprise Publishing Company in 2015 to purchase the paper. In a 2016 interview, Zaitz professed no grand ambitions with the paper. At the time of the purchase, the paper had but one reporter. Callister ran the paper for the first year, while Zaitz finished his tenure at the Oregonian.

Zaitz brought a distinguished resume, having earned widespread recognition for his coverage of the 1980 eruption of Mount St. Helens, the Rajneeshpuram community of the 1980s, and the occupation of the Malheur National Wildlife Refuge in 2016. He had also been a Pulitzer Prize finalist twice, for his coverage of non-profits and Mexican drug cartels. By the time he took the helm, he was ready to fully embrace a turnaround, and insisted to his two reporters that they were going to be the "best there ever was," and held their reporting to a high standard. He felt that local newspapers could serve as "laboratories" for the evolving news industry.

In early 2017, the reporting team uncovered what would prove to be a major scandal. A man who killed his ex-wife, and whose arrest caused another death, had previously faked insanity to avoid prison on a kidnapping charge. When the Enterprise sought the release of more than 200 records related to his release, the Oregon Psychiatric Security Review Board sued the Enterprise and its editor. The Enterprise appealed to its readers for legal funds, and Zaitz told the review board that picking a fight with a small paper was like "poking a stick in a badger hole." The Seattle Times published a column supporting the Enterprise, and other influential people and agencies expressed support as well. Oregon governor Kate Brown ultimately intervened, ordering the records released.

When Investigative Reporters and Editors conferred its national FOI (freedom of information) Award to the team of Zaitz, Braese and Caldwell, it marked the first time in the award's 20-year history that it went to a community paper. The team also earned one of three finalist spots for the 2017 annual award in the Scripps Howard Foundation's First Amendment category.

ProPublica, a national news organization, announced in December 2017 that the Enterprise would be one of seven news outlets—and the only weekly paper—selected from a field of 239 to be part of its Local Reporting Network. The award includes the salary of one reporter, as well as extensive support and guidance for their reporting.

In a 2018 editorial written under the Local Reporting Network program, Zaitz told the story of how the paper had effected the release of the documents and stated that the records he had obtained would contribute to future reporting on related issues.

In November 2018, Zaitz estimated that the paper's circulation had doubled, and revenue tripled, in the preceding three years. Zaitz launched the Salem Reporter in Salem, Oregon in September, 2018.

References

External links 
 Official Website

1909 establishments in Oregon
Newspapers published in Oregon
Publications established in 1909
Vale, Oregon